Abu Askar (also Romanized as Abū ‘Askar; also known as Abū ‘Asgar) is a village in Hangam Rural District, in the Central District of Qir and Karzin County, Fars Province, Iran. At the 2006 census, its population was 731, in 175 families.

References 

Populated places in Qir and Karzin County